Anhypotrix is a genus of moths of the family Noctuidae.

Species
Anhypotrix tristis (Barnes & McDunnough, 1910)

References 

Noctuinae